Olga Michałkiewicz (born 26 July 1994) is a Polish representative rower. She is an Olympian, dual underage world champion and a European bronze medalist in the coxless four.

At the 2019 World Rowing Championships in Ottensheim, Michałkiewicz competed in the W4- with Joanna Dittman, Monika Chabel and Maria Wierzbowska where they finished in fourth place in Final A which gave them a qualification berth for the 2020 Summer Olympics. She competed in the women's coxless four event at the 2020 Summer Olympics.

References

1994 births
Living people
People from Szczecinek
Polish female rowers
World Rowing Championships medalists for Poland
Olympic rowers of Poland
Rowers at the 2020 Summer Olympics